Cyperus sharonensis is a species of sedge that is native to western parts of the Israel.

See also 
 List of Cyperus species

References 

sharonensis
Plants described in 1995
Flora of Israel